Hydrogen purity or hydrogen quality describes the presence of impurities in hydrogen when used as a fuel gas. Impurities in hydrogen can interfere with the proper functioning of equipment that stores, distributes, or uses hydrogen fuel.

Hydrogen Purity Requirements 
The impact of impurities varies with the specific equipment used and on the physio-chemical nature of the impurity. For example, hydrogen boilers that combust hydrogen will generally tolerate higher concentrations of impurities than a vehicle using a polymer electrolyte membrane fuel cell (PEMFC) and inert impurities such as nitrogen are usually less harmful than reactive species such as hydrogen sulphide.

As the specific impurity matters it is not sufficient to rely on normal metrics of gas purity,  often reported using nines (e.g. >99.9990% or 5.0N), as this does not provide adequate information about which impurities may be present at trace levels. Instead, standards have been developed that provide more detailed requirements on fuel purity for specific applications. The international standard ISO 14687:2019  specifies maximum permissible concentrations for many key impurities depending on use. This standard is being adopted into legislation in many jurisdictions. For example, in Europe the Directive 2014/94/EU on the deployment of alternative fuels infrastructure states that the hydrogen purity dispensed by hydrogen refuelling points shall comply with the technical specifications included in ISO 14687-2.

Fuel Cell Electric Vehicles 
Fuel cell electric vehicles commonly use polymer electrolyte membrane fuel cells (PEMFC) which are susceptible to a range of impurities. Impurities impact PEMFC using a range of mechanisms, these may include poisoning the anode hydrogen oxidation reaction catalysts, reducing the ionic conductivity of the ionomer and membrane, altering wetting behaviour of components or blocking porosity in diffusion media. The impact of some impurities like carbon monoxide, formic acid, or formaldehyde is reversible with PEMFC performance recovering once the supply of impurity is removed. Other impurities, for example sulphurous compounds, may cause irreversible degradation. The permissible limits of hydrogen impurities are shown below.

Efforts to assess the compliance of hydrogen supplied by hydrogen refuelling stations against the ISO-14687 standard have been performed. While the hydrogen was generally found to be 'good' violations of the standard have been reported, most frequently for nitrogen, water and oxygen.

Combustion Engines and Appliances 
Combustion applications are generally more tolerant of hydrogen impurities than PEFMC, as such the ISO-14687 standard for permissible impurities is less strict. This standard has itself been criticised with revisions proposed to make it more lenient and therefore suitable for hydrogen distributed through a repurposed gas network.

Sources of Hydrogen Impurities 
The presence of impurities in hydrogen depends on the feedstock and the production process. Hydrogen produced by electrolysis of water may routinely include trace oxygen and water, which must be usually be removed prior to use. Hydrogen produced by reforming of hydrocarbons is produced as a mixture with a stoichiometric mixture with carbon dioxide and carbon monoxide which must be separated, additionally trace impurities from the feedstock such as sulphur compounds may be present in the final hydrogen supply. Impurities may also be introduced during storage, distribution, dispensing or as a result of equipment malfunction. Examples of this include distribution of hydrogen through repurposed gas networks which may be contaminated with a range of impurities or malfunctioning of equipment at refuelling stations. Some impurities may be added deliberately, for example odorants to aid detection of gas leaks.

Methods for Hydrogen Purity Analysis 
As the permissible concentrations for many impurities are very low this sets stringent demands on the sensitivity of the analytical methods. Moreover, the high reactivity of some impurities requires use of a properly passivated sampling and analytical systems. Sampling of hydrogen of is challenging and care must be taken to ensure that impurities are not introduced to the sample and that impurities do not absorb on or react within the sampling equipment, there are currently different methods for sampling but rely on filling a gas cylinder from the refuelling nozzle of a refuelling station. Efforts are underway to standardise and compare sampling strategies. A combination of different instruments is needed to assess hydrogen samples for all of the components listed in ISO 14687-2.  Techniques suitable for individual impurities are indicated in the table below.

In addition to rigorous laboratory analysis analytical methods that can be operated in the field continuously assessing hydrogen for impurities are being developed. These include techniques such as electrochemical sensors  and mass spectrometry.

Methods for Purifying Hydrogen 
See also: Hydrogen purifier

Purification of hydrogen is an important aspect of hydrogen distribution and there are a range of technologies available depending on the impurities present and process conditions.

See also

 Hydrogen station
 Hydrogen fuel
 Hydrogen purifier
 Proton-exchange membrane fuel cell
 MetroHyVe2 Project
 Hydraite Project
 National Physical Laboratory Hydrogen Purity

References

Hydrogen
Hydrogen technologies